Tolosa is a town located in the La Plata Partido of Buenos Aires Province, Argentina. It is part of the Greater La Plata metropolitan area.

Tolosa is the birthplace of former President and incumbent Vice President of Argentina Cristina Fernández de Kirchner.

References

Populated places in Buenos Aires Province
Populated places established in 1871
1871 establishments in Argentina
La Plata Partido